Leslie G. Cliff,  (born March 11, 1955), later known by her married name Leslie Tindle, is a Canadian former competitive swimmer who participated in the Olympics, Commonwealth Games and Pan American Games.

Swimming career
She competed at the 1970 British Commonwealth Games and won two gold medals at the 1974 Commonwealth Games.

She was born in Vancouver, British Columbia, where she attended York House School.  As a 17-year-old, she won the silver medal in the 400-metre individual medley at the 1972 Summer Olympics in Munich, Germany.

Despite being Canadian she won the 'Open' ASA National British Championships over 400 metres freestyle,  the 800 metres freestyle title  and both the 200 metres medley title and 400 metres medley title in 1974.

In 1971, Cliff was made an Officer of the Order of Canada. She was inducted into the BC Sports Hall of Fame in 1976, Canada's Sports Hall of Fame in 1984, and the Canadian Olympic Hall of Fame in 1997.

See also
 List of Olympic medalists in swimming (women)
 List of Commonwealth Games medallists in swimming (women)

References

External links
 Leslie Cliff at Swimming Canada
 
 
 
 
 

1955 births
Living people
Canadian female backstroke swimmers
Canadian female butterfly swimmers
Canadian female freestyle swimmers
Canadian female medley swimmers
Medalists at the 1972 Summer Olympics
Officers of the Order of Canada
Olympic swimmers of Canada
Swimmers from Vancouver
Swimmers at the 1970 British Commonwealth Games
Swimmers at the 1971 Pan American Games
Swimmers at the 1972 Summer Olympics
Swimmers at the 1974 British Commonwealth Games
Pan American Games gold medalists for Canada
Pan American Games silver medalists for Canada
Olympic silver medalists for Canada
Olympic silver medalists in swimming
Commonwealth Games medallists in swimming
Commonwealth Games gold medallists for Canada
Pan American Games medalists in swimming
Medalists at the 1971 Pan American Games
Arizona State Sun Devils women's swimmers
20th-century Canadian women
Medallists at the 1974 British Commonwealth Games